The 1968 All-Ireland Senior Football Championship Final was the 81st All-Ireland Final and the deciding match of the 1968 All-Ireland Senior Football Championship, an inter-county Gaelic football tournament for the top teams in Ireland.

This was Down's third appearance in an All-Ireland final, and they won all three. It was the third of three All-Ireland football titles won by Down in the 1960s, which made them joint "team of the decade" with Galway who also won three.

In 2018, Martin Breheny listed this as the eleventh greatest All-Ireland Senior Football Championship Final.

Match

Summary
Seán O'Neill and John Murphy each scored a goal which contributed to Down being in the lead by eight points following eight minutes of play. Kerry never recovered.

Seán O'Neill and John Murphy scored scrappy goals for Down, while Brendan Lynch's goal for Kerry was too late to make a difference.

Details

References

All-Ireland Senior Football Championship Final
All-Ireland Senior Football Championship Final
All-Ireland Senior Football Championship Final, 1968
All-Ireland Senior Football Championship Finals
All-Ireland Senior Football Championship Finals
Down county football team matches
Kerry county football team matches